Massachusetts's 9th congressional district special election of 2001 was held on October 16, 2001 to fill the vacancy caused by the death of Representative Joe Moakley. Democratic State Senator Stephen F. Lynch won the election; defeating six candidates in the Democratic primary and three in the general election.

Primaries
The Democratic and Republican primaries were held on September 11, 2001. The election was overshadowed by the September 11 attacks, which occurred shortly after polls opened.

Stephen Lynch defeated State Senators Cheryl Jacques, Brian A. Joyce, and Marc R. Pacheco, former federal prosecutor William F. Sinnott, housing advocate John E. Taylor, and activist William A. Ferguson, Jr. for the Democratic nomination.

State Senator Jo Ann Sprague defeated State Republican Committeeman William D. McKinney for the Republican nomination.

General election
Stephen F. Lynch won the general election. He defeated his nearest competitor, Jo Ann Sprague, by over 22,000 votes.

References

Massachusetts 2001 09
Massachusetts 2001 09
2001 09 Special
Massachusetts 09 Special
United States House of Representatives 09 Special
United States House of Representatives 2001 09
October 2001 events in the United States